This is a list of law enforcement agencies in Louisiana.

According to the US Bureau of Justice Statistics' 2008 Census of State and Local Law Enforcement Agencies, the state had 348 law enforcement agencies employing 18,050 sworn police officers, about 405 for each 100,000 residents. This is the largest ratio of policemen to residents of any state and compares to a national average of 251 to 100,000.

State agencies 
 Louisiana Department of Children and Family Services
  Child Support Enforcement
 Louisiana Department of Environmental Quality
 Louisiana Department of Health and Hospitals
 Louisiana Medical Center Police
 Louisiana Department of Justice
 Louisiana Department of Public Safety
 Louisiana Division of Levee District Police
 Atchafalaya Basin Levee District Police Department
 East Jefferson Levee District Police Department
 Lafourche Basin Levee District Police Department
 Lake Borgne Levee District Police Department
 Orleans Levee District Police Department
 Pontchartrain Levee District Police Department
 Tensas Basin Levee District Police Department
 Louisiana State Fire Marshal
 Louisiana State Police
 Louisiana Department of Public Safety & Corrections
 Louisiana Department of Corrections - Adult Probation and Parole
 Division of Youth Services - Office of Juvenile Justice
 Louisiana Department of Revenue & Taxation
 Louisiana Alcoholic Beverage Control
 Louisiana Department of Transportation and Development
 Crescent City Connection Police
 Weight Enforcement Police
 Louisiana Department of Wildlife & Fisheries - Enforcement Division
 Louisiana Livestock Brand Commission Enforcement
 Louisiana Office of State Parks - Enforcement Division
 Louisiana State Museum Police
 Louisiana Military Department Police
 New Orleans City Park Police

Parish agencies 

Acadia Parish Sheriff's Office
Allen Parish Sheriff's Office
Ascension Parish Sheriff's Office
Assumption Parish Sheriff's Office
Avoyelles Parish Sheriff's Office
Beauregard Parish Sheriff's Office
Bienville Parish Sheriff's Office
Bossier Parish Sheriff's Office
Caddo Parish Constable's Office
Caddo Parish Sheriff's Office
Calcasieu Parish Sheriff's Office
Caldwell Parish Sheriff's Office
Cameron Parish Sheriff's Office
Catahoula Parish Sheriff's Office
Claiborne Parish Sheriff's Office
Concordia Parish Sheriff's Office
Desoto Parish Sheriff's Office
East Baton Rouge Parish Sheriff's Office
East Carroll Parish Sheriff's Office
East Feliciana Parish Sheriff's Office
Evangeline Parish Sheriff's Office
Franklin Parish Sheriff's Office
Grant Parish Sheriff's Office

Iberia Parish Sheriff's Office
Iberville Parish Sheriff's Office
Jackson Parish Sheriff's Office
Jefferson Parish Sheriff's Office
Jefferson Davis Parish Sheriff's Office
Lafayette Parish Sheriff's Office
Lafourche Parish Sheriff's Office
LaSalle Parish Sheriff's Office
Lincoln Parish Sheriff's Office
Livingston Parish Sheriff's Office
Madison Parish Sheriff's Office
Morehouse Parish Sheriff's Office
Natchitoches Parish Sheriff's Office
Orleans Parish Sheriff's Office
Ouachita Parish Sheriff's Office
Plaquemines Parish Sheriff's Office
Pointe Coupee Parish Sheriff's Office
Rapides Parish Sheriff's Office
Red River Parish Sheriff's Office
Richland Parish Parish Sheriff's Office
Sabine Parish Sheriff's Office

St. Bernard Parish Sheriff's Office
St. Charles Parish Sheriff's Office
St. Helena Parish Sheriff's Office
St. James Parish Sheriff's Office
St. John Parish Sheriff's Office
St. Landry Parish Sheriff's Office
St. Martin Parish Sheriff's Office
St. Mary Parish Sheriff's Office
St. Tammany Parish Sheriff's Office
Tangipahoa Parish Sheriff's Office
Tensas Parish Sheriff's Office
Terrebonne Parish Sheriff's Office
Union Parish Sheriff's Office
Vermilion Parish Sheriff's Office
Vernon Parish Sheriff's Office
Washington Parish Sheriff's Office
Webster Parish Sheriff's Office
West Baton Rouge Parish Sheriff's Office
West Carroll Parish Sheriff's Office
West Feliciana Parish Sheriff's Office
Winn Parish Sheriff's Office

City / municipal agencies 

Abbeville Police Department
Addis Police Department
Albany Police Department 
Alexandria Police Department  
Amite Police Department
Anacoco Police Department 
Angie Police Department 
Arcadia Police Department
Arnaudville Police Department
Ashland Police Department
Athens Police Department
Baker Police Department
Baldwin Police Department
Ball Police Department
Basile Police Department
Bastrop Police Department
Baton Rouge Police Department
Benton Police Department
Bernice Police Department
Berwick Police Department
Biloxi Police Department
Blanchard Police Department
Bogalusa Police Department
Bonita Police Department
Bossier City Police Department
Boyce Police Department
Breaux Bridge Police Department
Broussard Police Department
Brusly Police Department
Bunkie Police Department
Calvin Police Department
Campti Police Department
Cankton Police Department
Carencro Police Department
Castor Police Department
Central Police Department
Chataignier Police Department
Chatham Police Department
Cheneyville Police Department
Choudrant Police Department
Church Point Police Department
Clerence Police Department
Clarks Police Department
Clayton Police Department
Clinton Police Department
Colfax Police Department
Collinston Police Department
Columbia Police Department
Converse Police Department
 Covington Police Department
Cotton Valley Police Department
Cottonport Police Department
Coushatta Police Department
Covington Police Department
Crowley Police Department
Cullen Police Department
Delcambre Police Department
Delhi Police Department
Delta Police Department
Denham Springs Police Department
DeQuincy Police Department
DeRidder Police Department
Dixie Inn Police Department
Dodson Police Department
Donaldsonville Police Department
Downsville Police Department
Doyline Police Department
Dry Prong Police Department
Dubach Police Department
Dubberly Police Department
Duson Police Department
East Hodge Police Department
Elizabeth Police Department
Elton Police Department
Epps Police Department
Erath Police Department
Estherwood Police Department 
Eunice Police Department
Eunice City Marshall's Office
Evergreen Police Department
Farmerville Police Department
Fenton Police Department
Ferriday Police Department  
Fisher Police Department
Florien Police Department
Folsom Police Department
Fordoche Police Department
Forest Police Department
Forest Hill Police Department
Franklin Police Department
Franklinton Police Department
French Settlement Police Department
Georgetown Police Department
Gibsland Police Department
Gilbert Police Department
Gilliam Police Department
Glenmora Police Department
Golden Meadow Police Department
Goldonna Police Department
Gonzales Police Department

Grambling Police Department
Gramercy Police Department
Grand Cane Police Department
Grand Coteau Police Department
Grand Isle Police Department
Grayson Police Department
Greensburg Police Department
Greenwood Police Department
Gretna Police Department
Grosse Tete Police Department
Gueydan Police Department
Hall Summit Police Department
Hammond Police Department
Harahan Police Department
Harrisonburg Police Department
Haughton Police Department
Haynesville Police Department
Head of Island Police Department
Heflin Police Department
Henderson Police Department
Hessmer Police Department
Hineston Police Department
Hodge Police Department
Homer Police Department
Hornbeck Police Department
Hosston Police Department
Houma Police Department
Ida Police Department
Independence Police Department
Iota Police Department
Iowa Police Department
Jackson Police Department
Jamestown Police Department
Jean Lafitte Police Department
Jeanerette Police Department
Jena Police Department
Jennings Police Department
Jonesboro Police Department
Jonesville Police Department
Junction City Police Department
Kaplan Police Department
Keachi Police Department
Kenner Police Department
Kentwood Police Department
Kilbourne Police Department
Killian Police Department
Kinder Police Department
Krotz Springs Police Department
Lafayette Police Department
Lake Arthur Police Department
Lake Charles Police Department
Lake Providence Police Department
LeCompte Police Department
Leesville Police Department
Leonville Police Department
Lille Police Department
Lisbon Police Department
Livingston Police Department
Livonia Police Department
Lockport Police Department
Logansport Police Department
Longstreet Police Department
Loreauville Police Department
Lucky Police Department
Lutcher Police Department
Madisonville Police Department
Mamou Police Department
Mandeville Police Department
Mangham Police Department
Mansfield Police Department
Mansura Police Department
Many Police Department
Maringouin Police Department
Marion Police Department
Marksville Police Department
Martin Police Department 
Maurice Police Department 
McNary Police Department 
Melville Police Department
Mer Rouge Police Department
Mermentau Police Department
Merryville Police Department
Minden Police Department
Monroe Police Department
Montgomery Police Department
Montpelier Police Department
Mooringsport Police Department
Moreauville Police Department
Morgan City Police Department
Morganza Police Department
Morse Police Department
Mound Police Department
Napoleonville Police Department
Natchez Police Department
Natchitoches Police Department
New Iberia Police Department
New Llano Police Department
New Orleans Police Department
New Roads Police Department
Newellton Police Department

Noble Police Department
North Hodge Police Department
Norwood Police Department
Oak Grove Police Department
Oak Ridge Police Department
Oakdale Police Department
Oberlin Police Department
Oil City Police Department
Olla Police Department
Opelousas Police Department
Palmetto Police Department
Parks Police Department
Patterson Police Department
Pearl River Police Department
Pine Prairie Police Department
Pineville Police Department
Pioneer Police Department
Plain Dealing Police Department
Plaquemine Police Department
Plaucheville Police Department
Pleasant Hill Police Department
Pollock Police Department
Ponchatoula Police Department
Port Allen Police Department
Port Barre Police Department
Port Vincent Police Department
Powhatan Police Department
Provencal Police Department
Quitman Police Department
Rayne Police Department
Rayville Police Department
Reeves Police Department
Richmond Police Department
Richwood Police Department
Ridgecrest Police Department
Ringgold Police Department
Robeline Police Department
Rodessa Police Department
Rosedale Police Department
Roseland Police Department
Rosepine Police Department
Ruston Police Department
St. Francisville Police Department
St. Gabriel Police Department
St. Joseph Police Department
St. Martinville Police Department
Saline Police Department
Sarepta Police Department
Scott Police Department
Shongaloo Police Department
Shreveport Police Department
Sibley Police Department
Sicily Island Police Department
Sikes Police Department
Simmesport Police Department
Simpson Police Department
Simsboro Police Department
Slaughter Police Department
Slidell Police Department
Sorrento Police Department
South Mansfield Police Department
Spearsville Police Department
Springfield Police Department
Springhill Police Department
Stanley Police Department
Sterlington Police Department
Stonewall Police Department
Sulphur Police Department
Sun Police Department
Sunset Police Department
Tallulah Police Department
Tangipahoa Police Department
Thibodaux Police Department
Tickfaw Police Department
Tullos Police Department
Turkey Creek Police Department
Urania Police Department
Varnado Police Department
Vidalia Police Department
Vienna Police Department
Ville Platte Police Department
Vinton Police Department
Vivian Police Department
Walker Police Department
Washington Police Department
Waterproof Police Department
Welsh Police Department
West Monroe Police Department
Westlake Police Department
Westwego Police Department
White Castle Police Department
Wilson Police Department
Winnfield Police Department
Winnsboro Police Department
Wisner Police Department
Woodworth Police Department
Youngsville Police Department
Zachary Police Department
Zwolle Police Department

College and university agencies 

Dillard University Police Department
Grambling State University Police Department
McNeese State University Police Department
Louisiana State University Police Department
Louisiana State University Health Sciences Center-New Orleans Police
Louisiana State University at Alexandria Police Department
Louisiana State University at Shreveport Police Department
Louisiana Tech University Police Department
Loyola University New Orleans Public Safety Department
Nicholls State University Police Department
Northwestern State University Police Department

Southeastern Louisiana University Police Department
Southwestern Louisiana University Police Department
Southern University Police Department
Southern University at New Orleans Police Department
Southern University Shreveport Police Department
Tulane University Police Department
Tulane University Health Sciences Center Police Department
University of Louisiana at Lafayette Police Department
The University of Louisiana at Monroe Police Department
University of New Orleans Police Department
Xavier University of Louisiana Police Department

Other agencies 

Housing Authority of New Orleans Police Department
Jefferson/St. Tammany Causeway Police
Greater New Orleans Expressway Commission’s Causeway Police Department
Office of the United States Marshal for the Eastern District of Louisiana
Office of the United States Marshal for the Middle District of Louisiana
Office of the United States Marshal for the Western District of Louisiana
Port of New Orleans Police Department

References

External links 
LA Sheriff's Association
LA Parish Government

Louisiana
Lawenforcementagencies
Law enforcement agencies of Louisiana